Abdi Abdulkadir Sheik-Abdi (born 15 November 1942, Somalia) is a Somali author based in the United States.

Academia
Sheikh-Abdi holds B.A. and M.A. degrees in English Literature and African Studies from the State University of New York and a doctorate in African History from Boston University. He has taught both in Somalia and the U.S., and is the author of numerous short stories, two novels, a collection of fables, as well as articles and essays.

Bibliography
The Luncheon, 1975
Rotten Bananas, 1979
Arrawelo: The Castrator of Men - a Somali fable
Divine Madness: Mohammed Abdulle Hassan (1856-1920), 1993
A book about Mohammed Abdullah Hassan, the Dervish leader and emir of Darawiish king  Diiriye Guure, who spearheaded the Somali resistance to British colonial interests in the early twentieth century; known by his followers as the Sayyid ("Master") and in the colonial literature as the "Mad Mullah". This book, which took Abdi more than ten years to complete, examines from a social and historical perspective the rise of the Sayyid and his movement. It consists of an introduction and six chapters.
Tales of Punt, 1993
Tales of Punt is a collection of eight Somalia folk tales retold by the author. This book gives insight into the cultural beliefs of many Somalis. 
When a Hyena Laughs: A Somali Novel, 1994
Novel about a young boy growing up in Somalia in the early 19th century. It depicts the goings on of daily life. As the young boy grows, so does his fascination and desire to go to the city.

References

Somalian novelists
1942 births
Living people
Boston University alumni
Somalian emigrants to the United States